Tankerton Slopes is a  biological Site of Special Scientific Interest in Whitstable in Kent. It is part of the Tankerton Slopes and Swalecliffe Special Area of Conservation

This north facing slope has a population of tall herbs, including the largest population in Britain of hog’s fennel, a nationally rare umbellifer. Fauna include agonopterix putridella, a nationally rare moth whose larvae feed exclusively on hog's fennel.

There is access to the site from Tankerton Beach. The height of Tankerton slopes vary across the site, but are approximately 50 feet (15 metres) high when measured from the promenade or 66 feet (20 metres) in elevation from sea level.

The bottom of the slope is fronted by Beach huts, and has a promenade  that runs from Whitstable to Swalecliffe that is popular with dog walkers and cyclists.

At the top of the slope to the West is a beacon that works by having a wood-based fire in a basket that is on top of a long wooden post.

The site also offers a view in the distance of the "red sands" Maunsell Forts of the Thames Estuary, the forty five wind turbines of  Kentish Flats Offshore Wind Farm, the Isle of Sheppey and at the West-end  "The Street" a "Spit of land" that appears at low-tide and allows walking 750 meters into the sea

Gallery

References

Sites of Special Scientific Interest in Kent
Special Areas of Conservation in England